Antal Lovas (20 December 1884 – 1970) was a Hungarian long-distance runner. He competed at the 1908 and 1924 Summer Olympics.

References

External links
 

1884 births
1970 deaths
People from Kecskemét
Athletes (track and field) at the 1908 Summer Olympics
Athletes (track and field) at the 1924 Summer Olympics
Hungarian male long-distance runners
Hungarian male marathon runners
Olympic athletes of Hungary
Sportspeople from Bács-Kiskun County
20th-century Hungarian people